Aaron Charles Donald (born May 23, 1991) is an American football defensive tackle for the Los Angeles Rams of the National Football League (NFL). He played college football at Pittsburgh, where he received unanimous All-American honors, and was selected by the Rams in the first round of the 2014 NFL Draft. Regarded as one of the greatest defensive players of all time, he has been named Defensive Player of the Year a record three times, along with receiving Pro Bowl selections in all nine of his seasons and seven first-team All-Pro honors. Donald was also a member of the team that won Super Bowl LVI.

Early life
A native of Pittsburgh, Donald grew up as one of three children in a working-class family in the city's Lincoln–Lemington–Belmar neighborhood. His father introduced him to workouts, seeking to provide more structure in his son's life. Donald himself would later admit that he was "lazy as a kid." By age 12, he and his father woke up at 4:30 am and worked out for nearly two hours in the basement gym that his father installed in the family home.

Donald attended Penn Hills High School, where he played high school football for head coach Ron Graham. He was selected first-team All-State Class AAAA in each of his final two seasons, and compiled 63 tackles, 15 tackles for loss, and 11 sacks as a senior. Donald also started at offensive guard.

Considered a three-star prospect by Rivals.com, he was rated as the 37th best defensive tackle in the nation. He committed to hometown Pittsburgh over other scholarship offers from Toledo, Akron, and Rutgers.

College career

As a true freshman, Donald played in all 13 games as a reserve defensive end for Pitt. He recorded 11 tackles, including three for loss, and two sacks. In 2011, as a sophomore, Donald moved into the starting lineup, and turned in a breakout campaign. He recorded 47 tackles, including 16 for loss, 11 sacks and one forced fumble, and was named a second-team All-Big East selection. As a junior, he recorded 64 tackles, including 18.5 for loss, 5.5 sacks, and one forced fumble, earning first-team All-Big East honors. In his senior season, he became one of the most productive defensive players in the entire NCAA. He posted 59 tackles, including a career best 28.5 for loss, 11 sacks, and four forced fumbles. He was named the ACC Defensive Player of the Year and was a unanimous All-American.

Statistics

Awards and honors

 Lombardi Award
 Bronko Nagurski Trophy
 Chuck Bednarik Award
 Outland Trophy

Professional career

At the NFL Combine, Donald set the record for fastest 40-yard dash time for a defensive tackle with a 4.68. The record was previously held by Tank Johnson, who ran a 4.69 in 2004. He drew comparisons to John Randle afterwards. Donald was drafted by the St. Louis Rams in the first round with the 13th overall pick of the 2014 NFL Draft.

2014 season

On June 16, 2014, the Rams signed Donald to a four-year, fully guaranteed $10.13 million rookie contract. The contract also included a $5.69 million signing bonus and a fifth-year option.

On September 7, 2014, Donald made his regular season debut against the Minnesota Vikings and finished the 34–6 loss with four tackles. The following week, he recorded three tackles and his first NFL sack during a 19–17 victory over the Tampa Bay Buccaneers. On October 13, 2014, he was given his first career start against the San Francisco 49ers and finished the game with four solo tackles. After recording 47 tackles, nine sacks, and two forced fumbles, Donald was one of five rookies selected to the 2015 Pro Bowl. Donald won the NFL Defensive Rookie of the Year award and was named to the NFL All-Rookie Team.

2015 season

In 2015, Donald began the season as a starting defensive tackle. During the season opener against the Seattle Seahawks, he finished with nine total tackles and two sacks, helping the Rams win 34–31 in overtime. He was named NFC Defensive Player of the Week for the first time in his NFL career for his performance. On December 13, 2015, Donald made five tackles and a career-high three sacks against the Detroit Lions in Week 14. He earned his second NFC Defensive Player of the Week award in 2015 after his performance against the Lions.

Donald started all 16 games, ending the season with 69 tackles, 11 sacks, a pass defended, and a fumble recovery. He earned a First-team All-Pro selection for the first time in his NFL career. He was a Pro Bowl selection for the second consecutive season. He was also ranked 14th by his fellow players on the NFL Top 100 Players of 2016.

2016 season

On September 12, 2016, Donald was ejected for making illegal contact with a referee in a 28–0 shutout road loss to the San Francisco 49ers on Monday Night Football. Four days later, he was fined $21,269 for unnecessary roughness ($9,115) and unsportsmanlike conduct ($12,154). During a Week 4 17–13 victory over the Arizona Cardinals, Donald had 1.5 sacks, five total tackles, one tackle-for-loss, five quarterback hits, and a forced fumble. He earned NFC Defensive Player of the Week for the third time in his career after his performance against the Cardinals. On October 21, 2016, he was fined $18,231 for an unsportsmanlike conduct after committing the penalty during a game against the Detroit Lions. Donald was named to his third straight Pro Bowl and his second First-team All-Pro. Donald was also ranked 15th on the NFL Top 100 Players of 2017.

2017 season

On April 12, 2017, the Rams exercised the fifth-year option on Donald's contract. He did not report to training camp and preseason due to a contract extension dispute. He accumulated about $1.4 million in fines due to his non-participation, and each game that he missed cost him one game check from his base salary of $1.8 million. On September 9, 2017, Donald reported to the Rams and passed his physical; however, he did not play in the season-opener against the Indianapolis Colts the next day, which the Rams won 46−9. Donald made his season debut against the Washington Redskins and recorded two tackles in the 20−27 loss. In the next game against the San Francisco 49ers, he recorded three tackles and sacked Brian Hoyer in the fourth quarter to seal a 41−39 road victory for the Rams. From Weeks 6−9, Donald recorded a sack in each game and had a forced fumble in three of them. During a Week 15 42–7 road victory over the Seattle Seahawks, he recorded five tackles, three sacks, and a forced fumble.

On December 19, 2017, Donald was named to his fourth straight Pro Bowl. He was also later named a first-team All-Pro for the third time. Donald finished the 2017 season with 41 tackles, 11 sacks, and a career-high five forced fumbles. After a stellar 2017 season, Donald was named the NFL Defensive Player of the Year. He was ranked #7 by his peers on the NFL Top 100 Players of 2018.

2018 season

On August 31, 2018, after holding out all offseason, Donald signed a six-year, $135 million contract extension with $87 million guaranteed. The deal made him the highest paid defensive player in NFL history, until Khalil Mack signed a $141 million contract with the Chicago Bears the next day after being traded from the Oakland Raiders.

During Week 7 against the San Francisco 49ers, Donald finished with four sacks on quarterback C. J. Beathard, along with nine tackles, six for a loss, and five quarterback hits in a 39–10 road victory, earning him NFC Defensive Player of the Week for the fourth time in his career. Donald was named the NFC Defensive Player of the Month for the month of October after recording eight sacks, 17 tackles, and a forced fumble. In Week 16, Donald recorded seven tackles (four for a loss) and three sacks in a 31–9 victory over the Arizona Cardinals, earning him his fifth NFC Defensive Player of the Week. His three sacks brought his season total to 19.5, which broke the record for most sacks in a season by a defensive tackle, previously held by Keith Millard with 18.0. Donald added another sack in Week 17 against the 49ers and finished the season with a league-leading 20.5 sacks. Donald was named NFC Defensive Player of the Month for December, his second such award in the season. Donald was named to the Pro Bowl for his 2018 season.

On January 4, 2019, Donald was named to the AP All-Pro First-team, being the only unanimous selection. On February 2, 2019, Donald was named NFL Defensive Player of the Year for the second consecutive season, joining Lawrence Taylor and J. J. Watt as the only players who have won the award in consecutive seasons. Donald helped the Rams defeat the Dallas Cowboys in the Divisional Round and the New Orleans Saints in the NFC Championship to reach the Super Bowl. In Super Bowl LIII Donald recorded five tackles but the Rams lost by a score of 13–3 to the New England Patriots, with the Patriots offensive linemen (including Joe Thuney) double teaming Donald in order to neutralize his effectiveness which was cited as a key factor in the result. He was ranked as the best player in the NFL by his peers on the NFL Top 100 Players of 2019.

2019 season

During Week 3 against the Cleveland Browns, Donald recorded his first sack of the season on Baker Mayfield in the 20–13 road victory. However, six days after the game, he was fined $21,056 for a roughing the passer hit on Mayfield. Three weeks later against the San Francisco 49ers, Donald sacked Jimmy Garoppolo twice in the 20–7 loss. In the next game against the Atlanta Falcons, Donald recorded a strip sack on Matt Ryan and recovered the football in the 37–10 road victory. During Week 11 against the Chicago Bears on Sunday Night Football, Donald recorded two sacks, four tackles, and a pass defensed in a 17–7 victory, earning NFC Defensive Player of the Week honors. During Week 16 against the 49ers, he sacked Garoppolo 1.5 times during a 34–31 road loss. Donald was selected for the 2020 Pro Bowl after finishing the 2019 season with 48 tackles, 12.5 sacks, two pass deflections, two forced fumbles, and a fumble recovery in 16 games and starts. He earned First Team All-Pro honors. He was ranked third by his fellow players on the NFL Top 100 Players of 2020.

2020 season

In the season-opener against the Dallas Cowboys on Sunday Night Football Donald recorded his first sack of the season on Dak Prescott during the 20–17 win. Two weeks later against the Buffalo Bills, he recorded two sacks on Josh Allen, one of which was a strip sack that he later recovered during the 35–32 road loss. During Week 5 against the Washington Football Team Donald recorded four sacks during the 30–10 road victory. He was named the NFC Defensive Player of the Week for his performance. Three weeks later against the Miami Dolphins Donald recorded a strip sack on rookie quarterback Tua Tagovailoa on Tagovailoa's first career passing attempt during the 28–17 road loss. In Week 12 against the San Francisco 49ers Donald recorded a sack on Nick Mullens and forced a fumble on running back Raheem Mostert that was recovered and returned by teammate Troy Hill for a touchdown during the 23–20 loss.

Donald was selected for the 2021 Pro Bowl. He earned First Team All-Pro honors. In the Wild Card Round of the playoffs against the Seattle Seahawks, Donald sacked Russell Wilson twice during the 30–20 win. On February 6, 2021, Donald was named 2020 NFL Defensive Player of the Year for the third time in four years. He was ranked second by his fellow players on the NFL Top 100 Players of 2021.

2021 season

In Week 12 against the Green Bay Packers, Donald choked offensive lineman Lucas Patrick. He was fined $10,300 for his behavior. Two weeks later, Donald had three sacks, five tackles, three for a loss, and a pass deflection in a 30–23 road victory over the Arizona Cardinals, earning NFC Defensive Player of the Week. He earned NFC Defensive Player of the Month for December. Donald earned a Pro Bowl nomination and First Team All-Pro honors. Similar to what happened in Week 12, Donald choked D. J. Humphries in the Wild Card Round against the Cardinals and threw a punch. The Rams won the game 34–11 to advance to the Divisional Round, where they defeated the Tampa Bay Buccaneers 30–27.

In the NFC Championship, his pressure of 49ers quarterback Jimmy Garoppolo led to a game-sealing interception as the Rams won their second NFC Championship in four seasons, by a score of 20–17. In Super Bowl LVI against the Cincinnati Bengals, Donald had two sacks and three quarterback hits, including the game-sealing pressure play on fourth-and-1 with less than a minute remaining that resulted in an incompletion and the 23–20 win. He was ranked second by his fellow players on the NFL Top 100 Players of 2022.

2022 season

On June 7, 2022, the Rams announced they had re-negotiated Donald's existing contract extension that was signed in 2018. The deal, which added $40 million over the last three years of the original six-year, $135 million deal, makes Donald the first non-quarterback to average more than $30 million per season.

NFL career statistics

Regular season

Postseason

Awards and highlights

NFL
 Super Bowl champion (LVI)
 3× NFL Defensive Player of the Year (2017, 2018, 2020)
 2× Sporting News NFL Player of the Year Award (2018, 2020)
 5× Pro Football Focus Defensive Player of the Year (2015, 2016, 2017, 2018, 2020)
 4× Kansas City Committee of 101 NFC Defensive Player of the Year (2015, 2017, 2018, 2020)
 2× PFWA NFL Defensive Player of the Year (2018, 2020)
 NFL Defensive Rookie of the Year (2014)
 7× First-team All-Pro selection (2015, 2016, 2017, 2018, 2019, 2020, 2021)
 9× Pro Bowl selection (2014, 2015, 2016, 2017, 2018, 2019, 2020, 2021, 2022)
 Deacon Jones Award (2018)
 PFWA All-Rookie Team (2014)
 NFL 2010s All-Decade Team
 Sporting News 2010s All-Decade Team
 Ranked No. 92 in the NFL Top 100 Players of 2015
 Ranked No. 14 in the NFL Top 100 Players of 2016
 Ranked No. 15 in the NFL Top 100 Players of 2017
 Ranked No. 7 in the NFL Top 100 Players of 2018
 Ranked No. 1 in the NFL Top 100 Players of 2019
 Ranked No. 3 in the NFL Top 100 Players of 2020
 Ranked No. 2 in the NFL Top 100 Players of 2021
 Ranked No. 2 in the NFL Top 100 Players of 2022
 3× NFC Defensive Player of the Month (2018 – October; 2018 – December; 2021 – December)
 8× NFC Defensive Player of the Week (2015 – Week 1, Week 14; 2016 – Week 4; 2018 – Week 7, Week 16; 2019 – Week 11; 2020 – Week 5; 2021 – Week 14)
 Pro Football Hall of Fame All-Decade Team - 2010s

College
 ACC Defensive Player of the Year (2013)
 Bronko Nagurski Trophy (2013)
 Chuck Bednarik Award (2013)
 Lombardi Award (2013)
 Outland Trophy (2013)
 Unanimous All-American (2013)

Personal life
Donald's older brother, Archie Jr., was a star linebacker at Toledo who "bounced around the NFL as an undrafted free agent until retiring in 2012". The brothers, who shared bunk beds in their childhood, frequently thought about one day helping their parents retire, which according to Gonzalez became one of the driving forces in Aaron's career. On April 27, 2020, Donald revealed on Twitter that he had graduated from the University of Pittsburgh with a degree in communications.

In 2021, Donald and his wife had a son. Donald also has two other children, a daughter and a son, from a previous relationship.

References

External links
 
 Los Angeles Rams bio
 Pittsburgh Panthers bio

1991 births
Living people
African-American players of American football
All-American college football players
American football defensive tackles
Los Angeles Rams players
National Conference Pro Bowl players
National Football League Defensive Player of the Year Award winners
National Football League Defensive Rookie of the Year Award winners
Pittsburgh Panthers football players
Players of American football from Pittsburgh
St. Louis Rams players
Unconferenced Pro Bowl players
100 Sacks Club